The 28th César Awards ceremony, presented by the Académie des Arts et Techniques du Cinéma, honoured the best films of 2002 in France and took place on 22 February 2003 at the Théâtre du Châtelet in Paris. The ceremony was hosted by Géraldine Pailhas. The Pianist won the award for Best Film.

Winners and nominees

See also
 75th Academy Awards
 56th British Academy Film Awards
 15th European Film Awards
 8th Lumières Awards

External links

 Official website
 
 28th César Awards at AlloCiné

2003
2003 film awards
2003 in French cinema
2003 in Paris
February 2003 events in France